Iftakar H Chowdhury, known as Iftakar Chowdhury is a Bangladeshi-American film actor, director and producer. He started his career as a director with Khoj: The Search. The film was released in 2010, and introduced new technologies in Dhallywood.

Early life and education
Iftakar Chowdhury was born to Bangladeshi parents but emigrated to the United States, settling in New York City. He completed his secondary education from La Guardia High School, later graduating from the College of Staten Island.

Career
He started his career with Khoj: The Search, which did well at the box office. His second movie was Dehorokkhi, starring Anisur Rahman Milon, Kazi Maruf, and Bobby, which was released in 2013. It was a success at the box office.

His third film, Agnee, released on 14 February 2014, became an all-time blockbuster. He has finished Bizli, Bangladesh's first super hero film shot in Iceland, Thailand, India and Bangladesh.

Filmography

As director

As actor

See also
 Cinema of Bangladesh

References

External links
 
 

Living people
Male actors from New York City
American people of Bangladeshi descent
American male film actors
American film directors
Bangladeshi male film actors
Bangladeshi film directors
College of Staten Island alumni
Year of birth missing (living people)